The 1995–96 Mighty Ducks of Anaheim season was the third season in franchise history. For the third straight year, Anaheim did not qualify for the playoffs.

Regular season

The Mighty Ducks allowed the fewest short-handed goals during the Regular season (5).

Final standings

Schedule and results

Regular season

Player statistics

Skaters

Goaltenders

† Denotes player spent time with another team before joining the Mighty Ducks. Stats reflect time with the Mighty Ducks only.
‡ Denotes player was traded mid-season. Stats reflect time with the Mighty Ducks only.

Awards and records

Awards
 Paul Kariya – Lady Byng Memorial Trophy

Records
 Todd Ewen – Most PIM in a season (285)

Transactions

Trades

Free agents

Signings

Waivers

Draft picks
Anaheim's draft picks at the 1995 NHL Entry Draft held at the Northlands Coliseum in Edmonton, Alberta, Canada.

Notes
 The Mighty Ducks fourth-round pick went to the Colorado Avalanche (formerly the Quebec Nordiques) as the result of a trade on February 20, 1994 that sent John Tanner to Anaheim in exchange for this pick (81st overall).
 The Mighty Ducks ninth-round pick went to the New York Islanders as the result of a trade on August 31, 1994 that sent Darren Van Impe to Anaheim in exchange for this pick (211th overall).

See also 
1995–96 NHL season

References

Anaheim Ducks seasons
A
A
Mighty Ducks of Anaheim
Mighty Ducks of Anaheim